Galal Amer (23 July 1952 – 12 February 2012) was an Egyptian journalist, well known for his sarcasm and sense of humor. He graduated from Egyptian Military Academy, and fought in several wars, such as War of Attrition and October War. He is an inspiration for many Arabian sarcastic journalists. After his death, a street was named after him in Alexandria, where he was born.

Journalism and publications
Galal Amer studied law and philosophy, and used to write short stories and poems, and some of them got published. He started as a journalist in Al-Kahera newspaper, and then his articles were published by several newspapers, and he wrote a daily article in Al-masry Al-youm newspaper called "Takhareef", then he started to use the social networks to publish his articles and views, and got followed by hundred of thousands of admirers.

He wrote Masr Ala Kaf Afreet, which got published in 2009; it discusses Egypt's biggest problems in a humorous way, and the average Egyptian's troubled life. Another of his well-known books is Estkalet Raees Araby, which got published in 2010.

Revolution
After the start of the Egyptian Revolution of 2011, Galal Amer was one of the people that opposed Hosni Mubarak and Supreme Council of the Armed Forces, and participated in the demonstration protests that demanded the end of military rule.

Death
On 12 February 2012, Galal Amer had a heart attack while he was in a protest. Newspapers published that the heart attack was caused by the scene of Egyptian protesters getting attacked by thugs.

Personal life
Galal Amer was married and had four children: Ramy, Rania, Ragy, and Reham.

References

External links
 Facebook Page

1952 births
2012 deaths
Journalists from Cairo